Jackaroo is a 1990 Australian mini series about a half-caste who goes to work on a West Australian property and falls in love with a girl.

David McCubbin was not Aboriginal. Producer Bill Hughes said they could not find an Aboriginal actor of the right age.

Cast

 Annie Jones - Clare Mallory
 David McCubbin - Jack Simmons
 Tina Bursill - Martha Logan
 Warren Mitchell - Ambrose Barbitron

References

External links
Trailer at YouTube
Jackaroo at IMDb

English-language television shows
1990s Australian television miniseries
1990 Australian television series debuts
1990 Australian television series endings
1990 television films
1990 films